Qaleh-ye Mohammadi (also Romanized as Qal‘eh-ye Moḩammadī; also known as Owghāzeh) is a village in Gifan Rural District, Garmkhan District, Bojnord County, North Khorasan Province, Iran. At the 2006 census, its population was 665, in 125 families.

References 

Populated places in Bojnord County